Roepkiella loeffleri is a moth in the family Cossidae. It was described by Yakovlev in 2006. It is found in Vietnam.

The length of the forewings is about 18 mm. The forewings are dark at the veins and light between them. The hindwings are black
with a narrow light border.

Etymology
The species is named in honour of S. Loeffler.

References

Natural History Museum Lepidoptera generic names catalog

Cossinae
Moths described in 2006